The Sword Stained with Royal Blood is a 1993 Hong Kong wuxia film based on Louis Cha's novel Sword Stained with Royal Blood. The film was written, produced and directed by Cheung Hoi-ching and stars Yuen Biao, Sharla Cheung, Danny Lee, Ng Man-tat and Anita Yuen

Cast

 Note: Some of the characters' names are in Cantonese romanisation.

 Yuen Biao as Constable Yuen Sing-chi
 Sharla Cheung as Ah-kau / Princess Cheung-ping
 Danny Lee as Ha Suet-yee
 Ng Man-tat as Kwai Sun-shu
 Anita Yuen as Ho Tit-sau
 Elsie Yeh as Wan Ching-ching
 Elizabeth Lee as Wan Yee
 Elvis Tsui as First Master Wan
 Barry Sze as Master Wu Hark
 Wu Ma as Suen Chung-sau
 Lung Fong as Second Master Wan
 Tai Bo as Fourth Master Wan
 Pauline Wong as Ho Hong-yeuk
 Helen Ma as Kwai Yee-neung
 Melvin Wong as Third Master Wan
 Peter Chan as Fifth Master Wan
 Ng Yuen-chun as Tsai Wan-ngo
 Yuen Fai

External links

1993 films
1993 martial arts films
1990s action films
Hong Kong action films
Hong Kong martial arts films
Wuxia films
Films based on works by Jin Yong
Works based on Sword Stained with Royal Blood
Films set in 17th-century Ming dynasty
1990s Hong Kong films